Ulmaris is a genus of jellyfish in the family Ulmaridae.

Species 
Ulmaris comprises two species:

 Ulmaris prototypus
 Ulmaris snelliussi

Distribution 
Ulmaris is found in marine environments.

References

Ulmaridae
Animals described in 1880
Scyphozoan genera